First Lady and First Gentleman of Panama are unofficial titles traditionally held by the wife or husband of the president of Panama.

List 

The following is an incomplete list of first ladies and gentlemen of Panama.

References

 
Panama